Alert Music was a recording, publishing, producing, and artist management company founded in 1984 by W. Tom Berry, based in Toronto, Ontario, Canada. It was home to Alert Records, an independent record label, which went defunct in 2014. The company has no current roster and is dormant.

Past recording artists 
 Michael Kaeshammer
 The Box
 Roxanne Potvin
 Gino Vannelli
 Andy Curran
 Johnny Favourite
 Universal Honey
 Eric Andersen
 Michael Breen
 Bündock
 Crystal Pistol
 Holly Cole
 Kim Mitchell

See also 
 List of record labels

External links 
 Official site
 Last.fm - Alert Music
 Alert Music archives at the University of Toronto Media Commons

Canadian independent record labels
Indie rock record labels
Companies based in Toronto
Record labels established in 1984